These are the full results of the 2012 South American Under-23 Championships in Athletics which took place between September 22 and September 23, 2012, at Estádio Ícaro de Castro Melo in São Paulo, Brazil.

Men's results

100 meters

Heat 1 – 22 September 9:20h
Humidity: 53% – Temperature: 23.0 °C - Wind: -1.2 m/s

Heat 2 – 22 September 9:20h
Humidity: 54% – Temperature: 21.0 °C - Wind: -0.1 m/s

Final – 22 September 11:55h
Humidity: 50% – Temperature: 23.0 °C - Wind: +0.3 m/s

200 meters

Heat 1 – 23 September 9:35h
Humidity: 54% – Temperature: 20.0 °C - Wind: +1.6 m/s

Heat 2 – 23 September 9:35h
Humidity: 54% – Temperature: 20 °C - Wind: +1.0 m/s

Final – 23 September 11:35h
Humidity: 43% – Temperature: 24.0 °C - Wind: +1.2 m/s

400 meters

Heat 1 – 22 September 10:00h
Humidity: 50% – Temperature: 22.0 °C

Heat 2 – 22 September 10:00h
Humidity: 50% – Temperature: 23.0 °C

Final – 22 September 15:20h
Humidity: 52% – Temperature: 23.0 °C

800 meters
Final – 23 September 14:30h
Humidity: 50% – Temperature: 24.0 °C

1500 meters
Final – 22 September 10:40h
Humidity: 46% – Temperature: 22 °C

5000 meters
Final – 23 September 9:00h
Humidity (initial/final): 54%/55% – Temperature (initial/final): 20.0 °C/20.0 °C

10,000 meters
Final – 22 September 16:40h
Humidity: 70% – Temperature: 17.0 °C

3000 meters steeplechase
Final – 22 September 16:20h
Humidity: 63% – Temperature: 19.0 °C

110 meters hurdles

Heat 1 – 22 September 14:00h
Humidity: 48% – Temperature: 23.0 °C - Wind: -1.2 m/s

Heat 2 – 22 September 14:00h
Humidity: 48% – Temperature: 23.0 °C - Wind: -1.2 m/s

Final – 22 September 15:50h
Humidity: 52% – Temperature: 22.9 °C - Wind: -0.9 m/s

400 meters hurdles
Final – 23 September 14:00h
Humidity: 47% – Temperature: 26.0 °C

High jump
Final – 23 September 10:00h
Humidity (initial/final): 51%/51% – Temperature (initial/final): 21 °C/21 °C

Pole vault
Final – 22 September 14:00h
Humidity (initial/final): 49%/50% – Temperature (initial/final): 23 °C/22 °C

Long jump
Final – 22 September 14:35h
Humidity (initial/final): 51%/52% – Temperature (initial/final): 22 °C/21 °C

Triple jump
Final – 23 September 15:15h
Humidity (initial/final): 58%/55% – Temperature (initial/final): 23 °C/22 °C

Shot put
Final – 23 September 9:00h
Humidity (initial/final): 54%/53% – Temperature (initial/final): 20 °C/20 °C

Discus throw
Final – 22 September 14:00h
Humidity (initial/final): 51%/49% – Temperature (initial/final): 22 °C/23 °C

Hammer throw
Final – 22 September 8:00h
Humidity (initial/final): 51%/58% – Temperature (initial/final): 23 °C/20 °C

Javelin throw
Final – 23 September 8:30h
Humidity (initial/final): 63%/55% – Temperature (initial/final): 19 °C/20 °C

Decathlon
Final – 23 September 16:05h
Humidity (initial/final): 63%/55% – Temperature (initial/final): 19 °C/20 °C

20,000 meters walk
Final – 22 September 7:00h
Humidity: 60% – Temperature: 21.0 °C

4x100 meters relay
Final – 22 September 18:15h
Humidity: 76% – Temperature: 16.0 °C

4x400 meters relay
Final – 23 September 16:35h
Humidity: 70% – Temperature: 18.0 °C

Women's results

100 meters

Heat 1 – 22 September 11:40h
Humidity: 49% – Temperature: 23.0 °C - Wind: -0.3 m/s

Heat 2 – 22 September 11:40h
Humidity: 48% – Temperature: 23.0 °C - Wind: -3.7 m/s

Final – 22 September 14:35h
Humidity: 50% – Temperature: 23.0 °C - Wind: +0.5 m/s

200 meters
Final – 23 September 11:50h
Humidity: 45% – Temperature: 24.0 °C - Wind: +1.2 m/s

400 meters
Final – 22 September 15:35h
Humidity: 54% – Temperature: 20.0 °C

800 meters
Final – 23 September 14:45h
Humidity: 51% – Temperature: 24.4 °C

1500 meters
Final – 22 September 14:50h
Humidity: 50% – Temperature: 22.0 °C

5000 meters
Final – 22 September 17:40h
Humidity: 74% – Temperature: 16.0 °C

10,000 meters
Final – 23 September 15:00h
Humidity: 51% – Temperature: 24.4 °C

3000 meters steeplechase
Final – 22 September 9:40h
Humidity: 46% – Temperature: 25.0 °C

100 meters hurdles
Final – 22 September 11:20h
Humidity: 50% – Temperature: 23.0 °C - Wind: -1.7 m/s

400 meters hurdles

Heat 1 – 23 September 10:35h
Humidity: 50% – Temperature: 22.0 °C

Heat 2 – 23 September 10:35h
Humidity: 50% – Temperature: 22.0 °C

Final – 23 September 14:15h
Humidity: 50% – Temperature: 24.0 °C

High jump
Final – 23 September 14:00h
Humidity (initial/final): 47%/51% – Temperature (initial/final): 25 °C/25 °C

Pole vault
Final – 22 September 9:05h
Humidity (initial/final): 58%/47% – Temperature (initial/final): 20 °C/22 °C

Long jump
Final – 23 September 9:00h
Humidity (initial/final): 53%/47% – Temperature (initial/final): 20 °C/23 °C

Triple jump
Final – 22 September 10:00h
Humidity (initial/final): 50%/47% – Temperature (initial/final): 22 °C/22 °C

Shot put
Final – 23 September 14:00h
Humidity (initial/final): 46%/51% – Temperature (initial/final): 26 °C/24 °C

Discus throw
Final – 22 September 9:40h
Humidity (initial/final): 54%/52% – Temperature (initial/final): 21 °C/21 °C

Hammer throw
Final – 23 September 11:00h
Humidity (initial/final): 48%/42% – Temperature (initial/final): 23 °C/25 °C

Javelin throw
Final – 22 September 15:35h
Humidity (initial/final): 52%/54% – Temperature (initial/final): 21 °C/20 °C

Heptathlon
Final – 23 September 17:00h
Humidity (initial/final): 52%/54% – Temperature (initial/final): 21 °C/20 °C

20,000 meters walk
Final – 23 September 7:00h
Humidity (initial/final): 76%/53% – Temperature (initial/final): 14.0 °C/20.0 °C

4x100 meters relay
Final – 22 September 18:30h
Humidity (initial/final): 76%/53% – Temperature (initial/final): 14.0 °C/20.0 °C

4x400 meters relay
Final – 23 September 16:15h
Humidity: 70% – Temperature: 19.0 °C

References

South American U23
Events at the South American Under-23 Championships in Athletics